As part of the British honours system, Special Honours are issued at the Queen's pleasure at any given time. The Special Honours refer the award of the Order of the Garter, Order of the Thistle, Order of Merit, Royal Victorian Order and the Order of St John. Life peerages are at times also awarded as special honours.

Lord Lieutenant 
 Brigadier Robert Aitken,  - to be Lord-Lieutenant of Gwent. – 21 January 2016
 Morfudd Ann Meredith - to be Lord-Lieutenant of South Glamorgan. – 14 June 2016
 His Grace The Duke of Buccleuch and Queensberry,  - to be Lord-Lieutenant of Roxburgh, Ettrick and Lauderdale. – 30 November 2016

Life Peer

Conservative Party

Mark Ian Price,  to be Baron Price, of Sturminster Newton in the County of Dorset – 4 March 2016

Most Noble Order of the Garter

Knight of the Order of the Garter (KG)
 The Rt Hon. The Lord Shuttleworth,  –  18 May 2016
 Sir David Brewer,  – 18 May 2016

Knight Bachelor 

 The Hon. Mr Justice Andrew William Baker –  16 December 2016
 The Hon. Mr Justice Peter Nicholas Francis –  16 December 2016
 The Hon. Mr Justice Neil Stephen Garnham –  16 December 2016
 The Hon. Mr Justice Nicholas Lavender –  16 December 2016
 The Hon. Mr Justice Stephen Nathan Morris –  16 December 2016
 The Hon. Mr Justice Michael Alexander Soole –  16 December 2016

Most Honourable Order of the Bath

Knight Grand Cross of the Order of the Bath (GCB) 
Honorary
 His Excellency Juan Manuel Santos – President of Colombia – 2016

Most Distinguished Order of St Michael and St George

Knight Commander of the Order of St Michael and St George (KCMG) 
Honorary
 Baron Peter Piot - for services to the global response to AIDS and the Ebola epidemic

Royal Victorian Order

Knight Grand Cross of the Royal Victorian Order (GCVO)

Honorary
 Kamalesh Sharma - on retirement as Secretary General of the Commonwealth of Nations - 24 March 2016

Knight Commander of the Royal Victorian Order (KCVO) 
 Major General Edward Smyth-Osbourne,  - on relinquishment of the appointment of Major-General commanding the Household Division. – 17 June 2016

Commander of the Royal Victorian Order (CVO) 
 Graham Paul Sharpe,  - on relinquishment of the appointment of Director of Property Projects, Royal Household. – 19 July 2016
 Lieutenant General Richard Nugee,  - on the relinquishment of his appointment as Defence Services Secretary. – 25 October 2016
 Nicholas Altham Kidd,  - on retirement as Training Captain/Aircraft Captain, The Queen’s Helicopter Flight. – 11 November 2016

Lieutenant of the Royal Victorian Order (LVO) 
 David George Clark,  - on retirement as Locksmith/Fitter, Royal Household. – 4 March 2016
 Chief Inspector Timothy Andrew Marriott Nash,  - Metropolitan Police - For services to Royalty Protection. – 19 August 2016
 Peter Charles Taylor,  - on the relinquishment of his appointment as Fire Safety Manager, Windsor Castle. – 14 October 2016
 Alan Richard Donnithorne,  - on retirement as Head of Paper Conservation, Royal Collection Trust. – 28 October 2016

Member of the Royal Victorian Order (MVO) 
 Terence Joseph Lynch - on retirement as Operations Surveyor, London Palaces, Royal Household – 23 February 2016
 Captain (QGO) Buddhibahadur Bhandari, Queen’s Gurkha Engineers – on relinquishment of his appointment as Queen’s Gurkha Orderly Officer – 15 July 2016
 Captain (QGO) Muktiprasad Gurung, Queen’s Gurkha Engineers – on relinquishment of his appointment as Queen’s Gurkha Orderly Officer – 15 July 2016
 Henry John Goulding; in recognition of his work for the Sandringham Estate and the Duchy of Lancaster. – 19 July 2016.
 Meryl Georgina Walter;  formerly Assistant Communications Secretary, Royal Household. – 18 October 2016

Most Excellent Order of the British Empire

Knight Commander of the Order of the British Empire (KBE) 

Honorary
 Prof. Martin Hairer FRS - for services to Mathematical Sciences

Military division
Honorary
 General Martin Dempsey, United States Army - 17 October 2016

Dame Commander of the Order of the British Empire (DBE) 
 The Hon. Mrs Justice Bobbie Cheema-Grubb –  16 December 2016
 The Hon. Mrs Justice Siobhan Keegan –  16 December 2016
 The Hon. Mrs Justice Nerys Angharad Jefford –  16 December 2016
 The Hon. Mrs Justice Juliet Mary May –  16 December 2016
 The Hon. Justice Denise McBride –  16 December 2016
 The Hon. Mrs Justice Finola Mary Lucy O’Farrell –  16 December 2016

Commander of the Order of the British Empire (CBE) 
Military division
 Major General Robert Bernard Bruce,  – 18 March 2016
 Brigadier James Richard Hugh Stopford – 18 March 2016

Officer of the Order of the British Empire (OBE) 
Honorary
 Gillian Anderson - for Services to Drama

Military division
 Captain Nicholas Cooke-Priest, Royal Navy – 18 March 2016
 Major Edward Gilbert Robin Cartwright, The Parachute Regiment – 18 March 2016
 Acting Colonel (now Colonel) Edward James Marston Dawes, Royal Regiment of Artillery – 18 March 2016
 Colonel (now Acting Brigadier) Angus George Costeker Fair,  – 18 March 2016
 Wing Commander Michael Robert Formby, Royal Air Force – 18 March 2016

Member of the Order of the British Empire (MBE) 
Honorary
 Sophie Katsarava - in recognition of her outstanding contribution to strengthening relations between Georgia and the United Kingdom in the education sector.
Military division
 Lieutenant Commander Andrew Scott Brown, Royal Navy – 18 March 2016
 Major Andrew Richard Nicklin, Royal Corps of Signals – 18 March 2016
 Major Richard Darren Walker, The Royal Dragoon Guards – 18 March 2016
 Flight Lieutenant Rebecca Jane Hutchings, Royal Air Force – 18 March 2016
 Lieutenant Colonel Gary O’Neil, Canadian Army – 23 September 2016

Distinguished Service Order

Companion of the Distinguished Service Order (DSO) 
 Captain Michael Olaf Chetwynd Dobbin, Grenadier Guards – 18 March 2016

Distinguished Service Cross (DSC) 

 Sergeant (now Acting Colour Sergeant) Robert Baden John Colley, Royal Marines – 18 March 2016

Military Cross (MC) 

 Sergeant Nicholas James Hillyard, Royal Corps of Signals – 18 March 2016
 Colour Sergeant Jordan Edward Mckenzie, The Royal Regiment of Scotland – 18 March 2016

Royal Victorian Medal (RVM) 

Silver
 Georgina Mary Jean Tindal - on retirement as Resident Warden, Pensioner Accommodation at Windsor. – 6 December 2016

Mentioned in Despatches 

 Colour Sergeant Stephen James Walker, Royal Marines – 18 March 2016
 Colour Sergeant Andrew Neil Brayshaw, The Parachute Regiment – 18 March 2016
 Colour Sergeant Ian George Gallagher, The Royal Regiment of Scotland – 18 March 2016

Queen’s Commendation for Bravery 
 Marine (now Acting Lance Corporal) Kieran Robert Scott, Royal Marines – 18 March 2016
 Sergeant James Lyndon, Royal Marines – 18 March 2016
 Staff Sergeant Peter James Ashton, Royal Regiment of Artillery – 18 March 2016
 Staff Sergeant Edward James Clinton, The Royal Logistic Corps – 18 March 2016
 Staff Sergeant Richard Thomas McKinnon, The Royal Logistic Corps – 18 March 2016
 Sergeant Dhaniram Rai, The Royal Gurkha Rifles – 18 March 2016
 Lance Corporal Sean Joseph Wilson, The Mercian Regiment – 18 March 2016
 Senior Aircraftsman Shane Joseph Mitchley, Royal Air Force – 18 March 2016

Queen's Commendation for Bravery in the Air 
 Sergeant Michael Edward Beamish, Royal Air Force – 18 March 2016

Queen's Commendation for Valuable Service 

 Acting Major (now Major) Henry Dowlen, Royal Marines Reserve – 18 March 2016 
 Petty Officer Engineering Technician (Weapon Engineering) Luke Ebsworth, Royal Navy – 18 March 2016 
 Warrant Officer 1 Engineering Technician (Marine Engineering) Alan Evans, Royal Navy – 18 March 2016 
 Commander Stuart Andrew Finn, Royal Navy – 18 March 2016 
 Corporal Matthew Goldsworthy, Royal Marines – 18 March 2016 
 Chief Petty Officer (Underwater Warfare) Julian Lee, Royal Navy – 18 March 2016 
 Marine August Emanuel Nils Lersten, Royal Marines – 18 March 2016 
 Petty Officer (Diver) Stuart Russell Rice, Royal Navy – 18 March 2016 
 Captain David Bissett Smith, Royal Fleet Auxiliary – 18 March 2016 
 Sergeant Lewis David Arthey, The Princess of Wales’s Royal Regiment – 18 March 2016 
 Lieutenant Colonel (now Colonel) Dominic Stead James Biddick, The Royal Anglian Regiment – 18 March 2016 
 Staff Sergeant Andrew John Coy, Army Air Corps – 18 March 2016 
 Sergeant (now Acting Staff Sergeant) Thomas Edward Trevithick Dawson, The Princess of Wales’s Royal Regiment – 18 March 2016 
 Sergeant (now Acting Staff Sergeant) Paul Anthony Dilloway, Royal Army Medical Corps – 18 March 2016 
 Lieutenant Colonel Mark Clement Gidlow-Jackson, The Rifles – 18 March 2016 
 Staff Sergeant Gregory Mitchell Haskins, Adjutant General’s Corps (Royal Military Police) – 18 March 2016 
 Brigadier Andrew Gordon Hughes,  – 18 March 2016 
 Warrant Officer Class 2 Paul Michael Kearney, The Royal Anglian Regiment – 18 March 2016 
 Staff Sergeant Richard Charles Kerry, Adjutant General’s Corps (Royal Military Police) – 18 March 2016 
 Lieutenant Colonel (now Acting Colonel) Eldon Nicholas Somerville Millar, Corps of Royal Engineers – 18 March 2016 
 Brigadier Charles Spencer Thomas Page,  – 18 March 2016 
 Major Samuel James Roberts, Intelligence Corps – 18 March 2016 
 Captain Philip Charles Rowland, Royal Corps of Signals – 18 March 2016 
 Warrant Officer Class 2 Jamie Rufus, The Rifles – 18 March 2016 
 Acting Staff Sergeant Gareth David Taylor, Corps of Royal Electrical and Mechanical Engineers – 18 March 2016 
 Captain Timothy James Hamilton Towler, The Royal Regiment of Scotland – 18 March 2016 
 Flight Lieutenant Samuel John Baker, Royal Air Force – 18 March 2016 
 Wing Commander Matthew Edward Lawrence, Royal Air Force – 18 March 2016

Order of St John

Bailiff Grand Cross of the Order of St John 

 Lieutenant Colonel Sir Malcolm Ross, 
 The Right Reverend Tim Stevens,

Knight of the Order of St John 

 John Walker Bain, 
 Geoffrey Thomas Ridley
 Surgeon Rear Admiral Lionel Jarvis, 
 Richard Ward Clark
 His Excellency Lieutenant General Edward Grant Martin Davis, 
 Lieutenant General Sir James Benjamin Dutton, 
 Dr Kenneth Forde
 Dennis Clair Hensley
 The Very Reverend Ernest Hunt III
 The Reverend Preston Telford Kelsey II
 The Reverend Dr Joseph Walter Lund
 General Sir John Chalmers McColl, 
 Mark Charles Pigott
 The Reverend Carl Dietrich Reimers
 John Winthorp
 The Reverend Deacon Robert John Amadeus Zito

Dame of the Order of St John 

 Dame Patsy Reddy, 
 Betty Darlene George Bialek
 Anna Mary Curren
 Vivian Ann Davidson Hewitt
 Karen Miller Lamb
 Aimée Madvay Squires
 Dr Catherine Dyer Stevenson
 Jane Hill Told

Commander of the Order of St John 

 Alan Clifford Cook
 Sir David Gascoigne, 
 Lieutenant Colonel John Arthur Pinel
 Brigadier Robert Aitken, 
 The Most Reverend Paul Kwong
 Captain (Retired) Roderick Peter Abell Sale
 Lee Warwick Short
 Kenneth Ivan Williamson, 
 Souella Maria Cumming
 Susan Paiahua Dunn
 Miss Sara Elinor Edwards
 Roslyn Ellen Smith

Officer of the Order of St John 

 Ang Lye Hong, 
 Michael Keith Bancroft, 
 Bryan Leslie Dittmer
 Colonel (Retired) Stephen John Franklin
 Roy Edwin Horwell
 The Reverend Peter Douglas Koon
 Rodney James Love
 Dr Michael Eric Nelson
 Trevor John Pelly
 Julian Mallory Price
 Philip David Rankin
 Manin Singh, 
 Annette Elaine Binnie
 Miriama Evans
 Ms Barbara Ann Lock
 Ms Sheryl-Lee Elizabeth Morrby
 Eileen Nancy New

New Zealand

References 

Special Honours
2016 awards in the United Kingdom
British honours system